Diploderma grahami, Graham's japalure, is endemic to China.

References

Diploderma
Reptiles of China
Reptiles described in 1924
Taxa named by Leonhard Stejneger